Navy Sea Hawks F.C. is a Sri Lankan professional football club based in Welisara. They play in the highest football league of Sri Lanka, the Sri Lanka Champions League. In 2018, Sri Lanka Navy SC was renamed to Navy Sea Hawks FC.

The team is under the patronage of the Sri Lanka Navy.

Managers 

  Kenichi Yatsuhashi (January 2021–)

References

External links 

Football clubs in Sri Lanka
Military association football clubs